Tesfaye Geleta Urgessa (born 1983) is an Ethiopian artist from Addis Ababa, based in Germany.

Career 
Tesfaye Urgessa studied under Tadesse Mesfin in Ethiopia. He graduated from the Ale School of Fine Arts and Design, Addis Ababa in 2006, and the State Academy of Fine Arts Stuttgart in 2014.

Urgessa was taught by professors who had studied art in Russia in the 1970s and 1980s, when the dominant art movement was socialist realism. Their focus was on the study of anatomy, which influenced Urgessa’s style.

At this time, through internet research, Urgessa's practice was inspired by prominent artists in Europe including Picasso, Lucian Freud and Francis Bacon.

Themes 
Tesfaye Urgessa’s images have themes of racism, class, policy brutality, injustice in politics and power. He combines traditional figuration with Ethiopian iconography, Cubism, and 1980s German Neo-expressionism.

Exhibitions 
Urgessa exhibited in "Oltre/Beyond" at The Uffizi Gallerie in Florence in 2018, and again in 2021. The Uffizi also hosts his work in its permanent collection, and "Von Denen Die Auszogen" at State Galerie Villa Streccius, in Landau Germany in 2019.

Exhibitions 

 2015 Body and Soul Sympra GmbH, Stuttgart. 
 2015 Free Fall Galerie Evelyn Drewes, Hamburg.
 2015 Untitled Galerie K, Köln, Germany.
 2016 Ethiopia Today - Begegnung mit Äthiopien Kunstation Kleinassen, Hofbieber-Kleinassen.
 2016 Fremdkörper Schacher – Raum für Kunst, Stuttgart. 
 2017 Auszeit Galerieverein Wendlingen, Wendlingen.
 2017 Free Fall Galerie Evelyn Drewes, Hamburg.
 2018 No Country for Young Men Galerieverein Leonberg, Leonberg.
 2018 Oltre/Beyond, Uffizi Gallery, Florence.
 2019 Atemzug Galerie Tobias Schrade, Ulm.
 2019 Ich Halte Dich Festhalten Schacher – Raum für Kunst, Stuttgart.
 2019 No Country for Young Men Addis Ababa, Ethiopia.
 2019 Von Denen Die Auszogen State Galerie Villa, Streccius, Landau.

Awards 
 2014 Akademiepreis der Kunstakademie Stuttgart
 2010 Camillo-Michele-Gloria-Preis, GasVersorgung Süddeutschland, Stuttgart.

References 

Ethiopian artists
People from Addis Ababa
Living people
1983 births